NA-111 Nankana Sahib-I is a constituency for the National Assembly of Pakistan.

Area
During the delimitation of 2018, NA-117 Nankana Sahib-I acquired areas from three former constituencies namely NA-135 (Nankana Sahib-I-cum-Sheikhupura), NA-136 (Nankana Sahib-II-cum-Sheikhupura), and NA-137 Nankana Sahib-III with most coming from NA-135 (Nankana Sahib-I-cum-Sheikhupura), the areas of Nankana Sahib District which are part of this constituency are listed below alongside the former constituency name from which they were acquired:

Areas acquired from NA-135 Nankana Sahib-I-cum-Sheikhupura
Sangla Hill Tehsil
Shah Kot Tehsil (excluding Chak No. 166/RB, Chak No. 177/RB, and Chak No. 184/RB)

Areas acquired from NA-136 Nankana Sahib-II-cum-Sheikhupura
Municipal Committee Warburton
Following areas of Nankana Sahib Tehsil
Warburton
Machharala

Areas acquired from NA-137 Nankana Sahib-III
Following areas of Shah Kot Tehsil
Chak No. 166/RB
Chak No. 177/RB
Chak No. 184/RB
Following areas of Nankana Sahib Tehsil
Mohlan (excluding Machharala)
Chak No. 370/GB
Chak No. 572/GB
Chak No. 574/GB

Members of Parliament

2018-2022: NA-117 Nankana Sahib-I

Election 1990 

General elections were held on 24 Oct 1990. Chaudhry Muhammad Barjees Tahir of PML-N won by 49,839 votes.

Election 1993 

General elections were held on 6 Oct 1993. Chaudhry Muhammad Barjees Tahir of PML-N won by 49,539 votes.

Election 1997 

General elections were held on 03 Feb 1997. Chaudhry Muhammad Barjees Tahir of PML-N won by 52,739 votes.

Election 2002 

General elections were held on 10 Oct 2002. Mian Shamim Haider of PML-Q won by 47,404 votes.

Election 2008 

General elections were held on 18 Feb 2008. Chaudhry Muhammad Barjees Tahir of PML-N won by 46,739 votes.

Election 2013 

General elections were held on 11 May 2013. Chaudhry Muhammad Barjees Tahir of PML-N won by 82,150 votes and became the  member of National Assembly.

Election 2018 

General elections were held on 25 July 2018.

See also
NA-110 Jhang-III
NA-112 Nankana Sahib-II

References

External links 
 Election result's official website

NA-135